Arctostaphylos pringlei (common name Pringle manzanita) is a plant that grows at elevations between 4000 and 7000 ft in southern California, Arizona, and southwest Utah.

Description
Pringle manzanita is a gray-green leaved shrub. It grows to about 4–6 ft. The plant may occasionally forms dense thickets. Pringle manzanita blooms in early spring forming small, whitish pink, bell-shaped flowers, occurring in clusters that later form red berries. The bark is smooth and mahogany-colored.

References

pringlei
Flora of California
Flora of Arizona